The 1941 VMI Keydets football team was an American football team that represented the Virginia Military Institute (VMI) as a member of the Southern Conference during the 1941 college football season. In its fifth season under head coach Pooley Hubert, the team compiled a 4–6 record (4–2 against conference opponents), tied for fifth place in the conference, and was outscored by a total of 173 to 134.  The team played its home games at Alumni Field in Lexington, Virginia, and Municipal Stadium in Lynchburg, Virginia.

Backs Bosh Pritchard and Joe Muha were selected by both the Associated Press and United Press as second-team players on the 1941 All-Southern Conference football team.

Schedule

References

VMI
VMI Keydets football seasons
VMI Keydets football